Roy Lewis Patterson (December 17, 1876 – April 14, 1953) was a pitcher in Major League Baseball. Nicknamed "The Boy Wonder," he played for the Chicago White Sox from 1901 to 1907.

Patterson started his professional baseball career for the Western League's St. Paul Saints in 1899. The following year, the team became known as the Chicago White Sox of the American League; in 1901, the American League became a major league. Patterson hit his peak in 1900-03, winning 15 or more games each year. On April 24, 1901, he became the first AL winning pitcher, as the other games that day were rained out. That season, Patterson won 20 games for the only time in the majors and led the White Sox in games started and innings pitched. Chicago won the pennant.

After 1903, Patterson remained an effective pitcher, but his workload diminished. He joined the American Association's Minneapolis Millers in 1908, pitching most of the next decade for them and winning over 20 games in four different seasons. He pitched and managed in the Dakota League from 1921 to 1922 before retiring.

Patterson took over his father's freight-hauling business after his baseball career ended. He died at the age of 76.

References

External links

, or SABR Biography Project

1876 births
1953 deaths
Baseball players from Wisconsin
Burials in Wisconsin
Chicago White Sox players
Chicago White Stockings (minor league) players
Fargo-Moorhead Graingrowers players
Major League Baseball pitchers
Minneapolis Millers (baseball) players
Minor league baseball managers
People from St. Croix Falls, Wisconsin
St. Joseph Drummers players
St. Paul Apostles players
St. Paul Saints (Western League) players
People from Vernon County, Wisconsin
Winnipeg Maroons (baseball) players